The Portland Museum of Art, or PMA, is the largest and oldest public art institution in the U.S. state of Maine. Founded as the Portland Society of Art in 1882. It is located in the downtown area known as The Arts District in Portland, Maine.

History
The PMA used a variety of exhibition spaces until 1908; that year Margaret Jane Mussey Sweat bequeathed her three-story mansion, now known as the McLellan House, and sufficient funds to create a gallery in memory of her late husband, Lorenzo De Medici Sweat, who was a U.S. Representative. Noted New England architect John Calvin Stevens designed the L. D. M. Sweat Memorial Galleries, which opened to the public in 1911.

Over the next 65 years, as the size and scope of the exhibitions expanded, the limitations of the Museum's galleries, storage, and support areas became apparent. From 1960 to 1962, Donelson Hoopes served as its director. In 1976, Maine native Charles Shipman Payson promised the Museum his collection of 17 paintings by Winslow Homer. Recognizing the Museum's physical limitations, he also gave $8 million toward the building of an addition to be designed by Henry Nichols Cobb of I. M. Pei & Partners. Construction began on the Charles Shipman Payson Building in 1981, and within two years the $8.2 million facility was opened to the public.

Payson's gift of the Homer paintings served as a catalyst for the Museum's expansion as well as for significant long-term loans and outright gifts to the Museum. In direct response to the Payson gift, the 1979 gift of the Hamilton Easter Field Art Foundation Collection added more than 50 paintings, sculptures, and works on paper by American modernists to the collection. In 1991, the Joan Whitney Payson Collection (owned by Charles Payson's wife Joan Whitney, a Whitney family heiress and New York City socialite) of 20 impressionist and post-impressionist works of art was given to the Museum on permanent loan. In 1996, Elizabeth B. Noyce, art collector and Maine philanthropist, bequeathed 66 works of American art, which is the most extensive and diverse gift of American art ever presented to the Museum.

The PMA attracts approximately 140,000 visitors a year, and has around 8,500 members.

Collection
The Museum's collection includes more than 22,000 artworks, dating from the 18th century to the present. The PMA's collection features works by artists including Winslow Homer, Marsden Hartley, John Marin, Louise Nevelson, Andrew Wyeth and John Greenleaf Cloudman. The Museum has the largest European collection in Maine. The major European movements from impressionism through surrealism are represented by the Joan Whitney Payson, Albert Otten, and Scott M. Black collections, which include works by Giambattista Pittoni, Mary Cassatt, Edgar Degas, René Magritte, Claude Monet, Edvard Munch, Pablo Picasso, and Auguste Rodin. The Elizabeth B. Noyce Collection, a bequest of 66 paintings and sculptures, includes paintings by George Bellows, Alfred Thompson Bricher, Abraham Walkowitz, and Jamie Wyeth, and masterpieces by Childe Hassam, Fitz Henry Lane, and N. C. Wyeth.

Facilities
The Museum's three architecturally significant buildings unite three centuries that showcase the history of American art and culture.

Since its opening in 1983, the Charles Shipman Payson Building has been the public face of the Museum. Although the original vision of both the architect and the Museum's strategic plan was to integrate all three buildings, the Charles Shipman Payson Building the L. D. M. Sweat Memorial Galleries, and the McLellan House only recently has the Museum been positioned to achieve this goal. In January 2000, the Museum launched a $13.5 million capital campaign to raise funds for the preservation and educational interpretation of its two historic structures.

The project to integrate the three buildings began in the fall of 2000 and was completed in October 2002. The McLellan House and L. D. M. Sweat Memorial Galleries have an emphasis on 19th-century American art, and the Payson Building houses European and American works from the 20th and 21st centuries. The project to "complete the Museum" returned the McLellan House to its original neoclassical elegance and the L. D. M. Sweat Memorial Galleries to their Beaux-Arts splendor, in the process creating distinctive spaces for the Museum's outstanding collection of 19th-century American art. The Museum's expanded space allows a more complete presentation of the permanent collection, which in recent years has grown in quality and historical importance. In 2014, Scott Simons Architects was engaged to develop a campus masterplan to help position the museum for growth. The museum is open from 10:00 a.m. to 6:00 p.m. every day except Monday and Tuesday.

In 2022, the Museum presented plans for a  expansion, announcing four finalist teams led by international firms, including Adjaye Associates, Toshiko Mori and MVRDV.

References

External links

Official website

Art museums and galleries in Maine
Museums in Portland, Maine
Art museums established in 1882
1882 establishments in Maine
Museums of American art
Public art in Portland, Maine